Inoxia Records is a Japanese record label that is closely related to the experimental music band Boris. In addition to releasing, Inoxia also distributes other Japanese labels such as Daymare Recordings, Pedal Records, and Diwphalanx Records.

Discography
Various artists - From Koenji to Eternity CD (1997)
Soft - Shamanic Waveform CD (1997)
Keiji Haino with Boris - Black: Implication Flooding CD (1998)
Thermo - drum plugged CD (1999)
Boris vs. Choukoku no Niwa - More Echoes, Touching Air Landscape CD (1999)
Thermo - Touring Inferno CD (2001)
Boris with Merzbow - Megatone CD (2002)
Boris - 1970 7"  (2002)
Gaji - 9pm at GFM CD (2003)
Niwa - I & I Harmonic Odyssey CD (2003)
Boris with Merzbow - 04092001 LP (2005)
Boris - Soundtrack from the Film Mabuta no Ura LP (2005)
Boris - Dronevil - final 2xCD (2006)
Sunn O & Boris - Altar CD (Japanese version) (2006)
Rollo - Pinhole LP (2007)
Boris with Michio Kurihara - Rainbow'' LP/2-LP box set (2007)

See also
List of record labels

External links
Official Inoxia Records site

Japanese record labels
Doom metal record labels
Heavy metal record labels